French DJ and EDM producer DJ Snake has released two studio albums, one DJ mix, and a number of singles. He released a live album on Apple Music on 2 October 2020 which he played in Paris La Défense Arena earlier in 2020.

Studio albums

DJ mixes

Singles

As lead artist 

Notes

As featured artist

Promotional singles

Other charted songs

Guest appearances

Production and songwriting credits

Remixes

Music videos

References 

Discographies of French artists
Electronic music discographies